Dame Penelope Jessel  (2 January 1920  – 2 December 1996), was a British Liberal Party politician.

Background
She was born Penelope Blackwell, a daughter of publisher Sir Basil Blackwell and Marion Christine Soans. She was educated at Dragon School, Oxford, St Leonards School, St Andrews, Fife, Somerville College, Oxford where she received a Master of Arts and the London School of Economics. In 1940 she married journalist Robert George Jessel. They had two sons, journalists David Jessel and Stephen Jessel. Her husband died in 1954. She was made a Dame for political services as part of the 1987 New Year Honours.

Professional career
From 1940 to 1941 Jessel worked at Oxford House, London. She enlisted into the Auxiliary Territorial Service, serving from 1941 to 1943. She was a teacher at William Temple College from 1956 to 1962. In 1965 she had published Owen of Uppingham. She worked as a lecturer at Plater College, in Oxford from 1968 to 1984.

Political career
Jessel was Liberal candidate for the Hall Green division of Birmingham at the 1964 General Election. She also fought the 1965 Birmingham Hall Green by-election. She was Liberal candidate for the Banbury division of Oxfordshire at the 1966 General Election. She was Liberal candidate for the Petersfield division of Hampshire at the 1970 General Election. She was Liberal candidate for the Wellingborough division of Northamptonshire at both 1974 General Elections. She did not stand for parliament again. She was President of the Women's Liberal Federation from 1970 to 1972. She was President of the Oxford Civic Society. She was Convenor of Trustees, for the John Stuart Mill Institute. She worked as International Officer, for the Liberal Party from 1985 to 1988.

Electoral record

References

External links
Obituary, The Independent. Retrieved 17 March 2019.

1920 births
1996 deaths
Dames Commander of the Order of the British Empire
People educated at The Dragon School
People educated at St Leonards School
Alumni of Somerville College, Oxford
Alumni of the London School of Economics
British Army personnel of World War II
Liberal Party (UK) parliamentary candidates
Auxiliary Territorial Service soldiers